Wetherall is a surname, and may refer to:

 David Wetherall (born 1971), English footballer
 Frances Wetherall (born 1952), British sprint canoer
 Frederick Augustus Wetherall (1754–1842), British Army general
 George Augustus Wetherall (1788–1868), British Army general
 Harry Wetherall (1889–1979), British Army general
 Jack Wetherall (born 1950), Canadian actor